Ana Clara Mello Lima (born April 11, 1997) is a Brazilian  reporter and presenter, best known for being finalist of Big Brother Brasil 18.

Filmography

Television

Internet

Film

Awards and nominations

References

External links
 
 

1997 births
Living people
Brazilian television presenters
Brazilian women television presenters
Big Brother (franchise) contestants
Participants in Brazilian reality television series
Vine (service) celebrities
Big Brother Brasil